Christianity is the predominant religion in Gabon, with significant minorities of the adherents of Islam and traditional faiths. 

Gabon is a secular country and the constitution ensures freedom of religion. Many people practice elements of both Christianity and traditional indigenous religious beliefs. Approximately 79 percent of the population (53% Catholic) practice one of the denominations of Christianity; 10 percent practice Islam (mainly Sunni); the remainder practice traditional religion or other religions.

History

Christianity arrived in Gabon through the Portuguese traders in early 16th century. The Italian Capuchin friars set up Christian missions in the 17th century. The Portuguese missionaries and Italian friars cooperation ended in the 18th century, and the Portuguese officials expelled the Capuchin friars in 1777. New missions such as the Sacred Heart and Holy Ghost, as well as Protestant missions from Europe arrived in the mid 19th century. Catholicism had established itself in Gabon with the Portuguese colonial efforts in 18th century, and grown to be the leading denomination by 1900. With the start of French colonial rule, Christian missions from Paris arrived between 1890s and 1960. More evangelical Churches have grown since the mid 20th century.

The Babongo are a forest people of Gabon on the west coast of equatorial Africa. They are the originators of the Bwiti religion. Other peoples in Gabon have combined traditional Bwiti practices with animism and Christian concepts to produce a very different modern form of Bwiti. The Bwiti rituals form part of the initiation into the Babongo people.  Babonga people's lives are highly ritualised through dance, music and ceremony associated with natural forces and jungle animals. Foreign missionaries are active in the country.

Islam has had a small presence in Gabon, with about 10% of the people following Sunni practice. The former president Omar Bongo converted to Islam in 1973 after a visit to Libya. Under Bongo's one-party rule, Gabon joined the Organisation of Islamic Cooperation in 1974. Gabon reintroduced multiparty democracy in 1993, though Bongo remained president until his death in 2009, upon which his son, also a Muslim, succeeded him.

The Constitution provides for freedom of religion, and the government generally respects this right in practice. The US government received no reports of societal abuses or discrimination based on religious belief or practice during 2007.

On February 3, 2016, the Gabonese Republic granted official recognition to the local Orthodox Church, including plans to erect the first Orthodox church in the capital city Libreville.

See also
Islam in Gabon
Roman Catholicism in Gabon

References